The Thaddeus Fisher House is a house in southeast Portland, Oregon, United States, listed on the National Register of Historic Places.

Further reading

See also
 National Register of Historic Places listings in Southeast Portland, Oregon

References

1892 establishments in Oregon
Houses completed in 1892
Houses on the National Register of Historic Places in Portland, Oregon
Portland Eastside MPS
Portland Historic Landmarks
Queen Anne architecture in Oregon
Sunnyside, Portland, Oregon